The Outsiders (Traditional Chinese: 鬥魚; Pinyin: Dou Yu; meaning "Fighting Fish") is a 2004 Taiwanese romance and action series starring then newcomers Dylan Kuo, Ady An, Blue Lan and Michael Zhang. The drama is often referred to as the Taiwanese version of the popular Hong Kong film series Young and Dangerous which is about the stories of triad gangs. The drama is Dylan Kuo's first lead role. Prior to the role, he was a popular model who only had bit cameo roles in dramas.  The drama began airing on channel GTV on 4 April 2004 on Sunday nights at 9:00 PM. It finished airing on 22 August 2004 with 20 episodes total.

A sequel, The Outsiders II, was produced and aired in the later part of 2004.

Synopsis
Three sworn brothers, Yu Hao (Dylan Kuo), Shan Zi (Blue Lan), and Yang Xiong Qi (Michael Zhang), that are delinquents, grew up together fighting local neighborhood rivals. Although they are not triad gangs, they make enemies with them when they offend some of their members. Yu Hao who is considered the leader of the three falls for good girl Xiao Yan Zi (Ady An). Yan Zi comes from a well to do family and has been taking piano lessons since she was young hoping to become a pianist. Yan Zi runs into a bloodied Yu Hao in the streets and saves him. Yu Hao, who has always been in love with Yan Zi, uses this chance encounter between the two to break the ice and chase after Yan Zi but the three sworn brothers end up joining triad gangs when they have to protect Yan Zi.

Cast

Main cast
Dylan Kuo as Yu Hao - Male age 19 
His mother abandoned him when he was little. Lonely and arrogant personality but toward his buddies, he is extremely loyal. He, who seems to be cold and ruthless, has deep feelings towards Yu Yan. Even though the buddies by his side and the gang's leader advises him not to take her along by his side and mess things up, yet Hao won't listen. For this, he even goes so far as gets into conflicts with Li Jie time and again.
Ady An as Pei Yu Yan / Yan Zi - Female age 17 
Yu Yan grew up in pure and simple environment. She is a second year student at Ying Da High School and a budding pianist. Elegant and delicate appearance, because her name has the character "Yan", therefore, the students give her the nickname of Xiao Yan Zi or Small Swallow. She is innocent and naive toward the affairs of the world. Yet all of this changes when she accidentally meets up Yu Hao. She regards love as the way of kindling life.
Blue Lan as Shan Li Jie - Male age 19 
Adoptive son of Geng Ji Xiong. Intelligent and cool-headed personality, a character who acts the image of a military expert. For the matter on Yu Yan, he urges Yu Hao time and again. When Yu Hao gets bullied and ruined a big event because of Yu Yan, causing one of their buddies to be snatched away by the slip of a piece of paper, Dan Zi couldn't stand it any longer and separated with Yu Hao, saying that they will no longer be acquainted with one another. But when Yan Zi left because of him and got trampled on when she didn't have any protection, Dan Zi returned again.
Michael Zhang as Yang Xun Qi - Male age 19 
Good buddies with Yu Hao and Li Jie since young. With regards to Hao, he obeys him to the extreme. Rash and frank personality. Thinks himself as carefree and unrestrained, he constantly changes girlfriends to show the difference of style between him and his buddies. Later he becomes a couple with Hong Dou and the two of them are always fighting around all day long.
Joelle Lu as Hong Dou - Female age 17 
Second year student at Ying Da High School, vicious personality. She was jealous and hated Yan Zi at first because of Yu Hao interest in Yan Zi, she would always cause trouble for Yan Zi. After Yan Zi and Yu Hao became an official couple she lost interest on everything that mattered to her and would speak without thinking. She gradually comes to accept Yan Zi as a friend after getting to know her better. She later becomes a couple with Xun Qi.

Supporting cast
Queenie Tai as Shao Xiao Die - Female 
Yu Hao first meets her, when she is 17 years old. Due to her father's gambling debts to Zhuang Ju Kuan, Xiao Die is forced to work at a motel as an hostess. She meets Yu Hao the first day she is at the motel, because of her damsel in distress appearance Yu Hao saves her from working as an hostess at the motel. Xiao Die has been bewildered and enchanted by Yu Hao heroic gesture ever since.
Pang Yong Zhi as Pang Rui Guo - Male
He is in a rival gang against Yu Hao, Li Jie, and Xun Qi.
Angus Hsieh as Ah Bao - Male
Originally in the same gang as Yu Hao, Li Jie, and Xun Qi, he later betrays their boss and joins a rival gang.
Tan Ai-chen as Grandma - Female 
Yu Hao's grandmother. She lives in an elderly nursing home. Yu Hao visits her every week.
Ken Lo as Geng Ji Xiong - Male
Yu Hao, Li Jie, and Xun Qi's original triad boss. He is unhappy with Yu Hao's growing power in his organization and plots together with Ah Bao to rid of Yu Hao but gets betrayed by Ah Bao in the end.

Original soundtrack

The Outsiders Original Soundtrack (CD) (鬥魚電視原聲帶) was released on 9 March 2004 by various artists under Warner Music Group Taiwan record label.  It contains 16 tracks, in which 7 tracks are various instrumental versions of the songs and original classical pieces. The opening theme is track 1 "Unfair 不公平" by Jenny Yang 蕭賀碩, while the closing theme is track 15 "Lydia" by F.I.R.

Track listing

Publications

A 128-page paperback cover photo book was published detailing behind the scenes and production of the drama.
 4 June 2004 : The Outsiders Photo Album (鬥魚電視寫真書) -  Cite publishing Group 商周出版

References

External links
GTV website

Taiwanese drama television series
2004 Taiwanese television series debuts
2004 Taiwanese television series endings
Gala Television original programming
Triad (organized crime)